Robert Philip Braidwood  BEng (born 11 July 1949) is a Manx politician, who was formerly a Member of the Legislative Council; he was previously an MHK for Douglas East after winning the Douglas East by-election in 1995 and he continued to top the poll in every General Election since then until his elevation to the Legislative Council in 2010, which sparked a by-election won by Chris Robertshaw.

He has had a long political career and has held numerous government positions, notably Minister of Transport (2005–06) and Minister of Home Affairs (2001–05).

Governmental positions
Chairman of the  Financial Supervision Commission, 1999–2001
Minister of Home Affairs, 2001–05
Chairman of the Communications Commission, 2001–05
Minister of Transport, 2005–06

References

https://web.archive.org/web/20121009061613/http://www.gov.im/lib/news/dha/theministerofhom.xml

Members of the House of Keys 1991–1996
Members of the House of Keys 1996–2001
Members of the House of Keys 2001–2006
Members of the House of Keys 2006–2011
Living people
1949 births